Widowmaker is a playable character appearing in the 2016 video game Overwatch, developed and published by Blizzard Entertainment. The character is of French origin; her real name is Amélie Lacroix (née Guillard).

Development and design
Widowmaker was first introduced at BlizzCon 2014, where her character was first noted to be a sniper and lightly armored assassin. She is based on one of the classes for Crossroads, an idea tossed around by the former Titan team before they settled on working on Overwatch.

Widowmaker was noted to be equipped with a grappling hook and the ability to see through walls. In November 2015, a patch was implemented to tone down Widowmaker's ultimate ability—"Infra-Sight"—as Blizzard continued its goal to keep the characters on Overwatch'''s roster balanced. The patch made it so that the player would not be able to have Widowmaker's ultimate charge up while Infra-Sight was active.

Her character is voiced by Chloé Hollings in the game's English and French versions. Some of her dialogue in the game's English version is spoken in French. Widowmaker is noted to have blue skin due to covert training in which her physiology altered to slow her heart, effectively turning her skin the color seen in-game. A "Noire" skin for the character was included on pre-ordered versions of the game.

In 2021, Blizzard showcased Widowmaker's updated design for Overwatch 2; the developers went for a more "cyberpunk" feel, with the character seen sporting a braid and new armor plating.

Gameplay
Widowmaker's role in Overwatch is on defense. Her defensive nature is reflected in her sniper classification, allowing her to be well utilized from a distance; VG247 called her a "classic sniper." Widowmaker comes equipped with the "Widow's Kiss": a rifle with two modes. Firing without aiming causes the rifle to function as close-to-medium assault rifle which is stronger than her scope. Aiming through her scope triggers the weapon to function as a long-range sniper rifle, that can eliminate many other characters with a critical hit. She also comes equipped with her Grappling Hook ability, allowing her to readjust her position and reach heights that other characters cannot. In addition, Widowmaker can wrist-fire a small Venom Mine that sticks to a surface and releases toxic gas when enemies wander into its area. While the poison is active, Widowmaker can see the affected enemy through obstacles, similar to her ultimate. Finally, her ultimate ability, Infra-Sight, allows Widowmaker and her teammates to see through obstacles to locate enemies. Her ultimate ability is able to be used to counter enemy flankers.

Appearances

Overwatch
Widowmaker's fictional biography details her real name: Amélie Lacroix (born Amélie Guillard), age: 33, and base of operations: Annecy, France. In Overwatch lore, her former life included her marriage to Gérard Lacroix, an Overwatch agent leading operations against Talon, a terrorist organization, and her former occupation as a ballerina. Talon opted to kidnap Amélie after several failed attempts to kill Gérard. After kidnapping Amélie, Talon subjected her to an intensive neural reconditioning program, breaking her will and reprogramming her as a sleeper agent for Talon. Sometime after this, she was found by Overwatch agents, seemingly unaffected by Talon's methods. Two weeks after returning to her normal life, she killed Gérard in his sleep, and returned to Talon, where she was fully converted into one of their agents. The extensive training she underwent caused her physiology to change, dramatically slowing her heart, lowering the temperature of her skin, and turning her skin a blue color. Now, her character is noted to be numb to human emotion.

Animations
Widowmaker appears in Alive, the second in an eight-part series of Overwatch animated shorts. The short is set in London's King's Row, which also the setting for a map in the game. Widowmaker's in-game abilities are also featured in the short. In the short, Widowmaker is featured on a rooftop plotting to assassinate Tekhartha Mondatta, the head of the Shambali, an in-universe group of omnics formed to bring peace between omnics and humans. She is confronted by former Overwatch agent Tracer, who engages in a rooftop battle with her; however, Tracer is unsuccessful in her attempts to foil Widowmaker. In addition to successfully assassinating Mondatta, Widowmaker also damages Tracer's chronal accelerator, which allows Tracer to maintain her physical form in the present time.

 Other appearances 
In Heroes of the Storm, there is a Widowmaker skin for the playable character Nova, and vice versa – in Overwatch, there is a Nova skin for the playable character Widowmaker.

Reception

The character has received positive critical reception; she was labeled a "classic sniper character" and "great defensive hero" by VG247 in their Overwatch hero guide, noting that she "works best in wide-open maps with long corridors". Matt Whittaker of Hardcore Gamer wrote that "the traditional sniper hero of the bunch, Widowmaker is a particularly lethal character for those with solid keyboard and mouse skill, or those who are particularly great at sniping with a controller," but did not recommend her for players whom don't have a precise aim. This sentiment was echoed by Kevin Thielenhaus of Gameranx, who noted that "[Widowmaker] requires skill, but even if you're new to online competitive FPS, she's powerful enough to help any team." Additionally she was the most selected defensive-class character during Overwatchs beta period.

Dean James of Attack of the Fanboy found Widowmaker to be one of the strongest characters in the game, Widowmaker has also been noted to be one of the most popular Overwatch characters; she was the most selected defense-class hero in the game during its open beta. Matt Kim of Inverse labeled Widowmaker as a "fan favorite" character. Her popularity with fans has led to Ben Bertoli of Kotaku calling her one of the most overused heroes. In a "Clueless Gamer" segment of Conan featuring Game of Thrones actors Peter Dinklage and Lena Headey, Overwatch was played, with Dinklage, Headey, and host Conan O'Brien all choosing Widowmaker. Her prevalence was also noted by Paul Tamburro of CraveOnline, whom complained that "In Overwatch you are sometimes greeted by more than one of these players per match, all assuming the role of Widowmaker, all standing on some ledge in the distance and all doing absolutely nothing to help you and your teammates push towards victory" in a list of the "10 Overwatch Problems That All Players Will Face."Paste magazine's Suriel Vazquez ranked Widowmaker 6th out of Overwatchs 21 characters on her "How Many Times They Made Me Yell 'Bullshit!'" list, expressing that "dealing with her is more frustrating than it should be." Will Greenwald of PC Magazine noted that Widowmaker was one of his five favorite characters to play with, writing "Bastion and Widowmaker gave me the ability to cover choke points at both short/medium and long range."Overwatch characters have also become frequent subjects to cosplay as, with a Widowmaker cosplay by Russian cosplayer Jannet "Incosplay" Vinogradova receiving praise from Hayley Williams of Kotaku, whom wrote that "This Russian cosplayer is taking the world by storm, with a cosplay of Widowmaker [...] that looks like it could have been ripped out of the game itself." Chris Jager of Lifehacker Australia similarly called her effort "the perfect Widowmaker cosplay" and "probably the best." Overwatchs release saw large amounts of fan-made pornography featuring its characters being produced; "Overwatch" related searches boosted by 817% on Pornhub after the game's open beta went live, with "the most popular characters [featured being] Tracer and Widowmaker." Tech Times remarked that "Widowmaker, by far, is the most traditionally sexy character in Overwatch. She's slim, tall, fit and wears high heels. Her outfit reveals more than a little skin to boot." However, Philippa Warr of Rock Paper Shotgun'' opined, "I don't really get why Widowmaker has been given the femme fatale styling. Like, that whole femme fatale thing is about being all alluring and sexy, attracting people and then killing them, right? And yet she's the snipiest sniper in the game. She stands the furthest away from people of the entire cast and shoots them in the head, sometimes without them even seeing her. Who could she possibly be alluring?"

References

Comics characters introduced in 2016
Dancer characters in video games
Female characters in animated films
Female characters in comics
Female characters in video games
Female video game villains
Fictional assassins in video games
Fictional ballet dancers
Fictional French people in video games
Fictional mariticides
Fictional marksmen and snipers
Fictional mercenaries in video games
Overwatch characters
Video game characters introduced in 2016
Woman soldier and warrior characters in video games